Revenge of the Creature ( Return of the Creature and Return of the Creature from the Black Lagoon) is the first of two Universal-International sequels to Creature from the Black Lagoon. It was the only 3D film released in 1955 and the only 3D sequel to a 3D film released during "the golden age of 3D". Produced by William Alland and directed by Jack Arnold (the director of the first Creature film), the film stars John Agar, Lori Nelson, John Bromfield and Nestor Paiva. The Creature was played by Tom Hennesy on land, and once again, portrayed by Ricou Browning underwater. It marked an early role for Clint Eastwood, in his film debut.

Revenge of the Creature premiered in Denver on March 23, 1955 and a "flat", non-3D sequel, The Creature Walks Among Us, followed in 1956. Revenge was released as a double feature with Cult of the Cobra.

Plot
Having previously survived being riddled with bullets, the Gill-man is captured and sent to the Ocean Harbor Oceanarium in Florida, where he is studied by animal psychologist Professor Clete Ferguson (John Agar) and ichthyology student Helen Dobson (Lori Nelson).

Helen and Clete quickly begin to fall in love, much to the chagrin of Joe Hayes (John Bromfield), the Gill-man's keeper. The Gill-man takes an instant liking to Helen, which severely hampers Clete's efforts to communicate with him. Ultimately, the Gill-man escapes from his tank, killing Joe in the process, and flees to the open ocean.

Unable to stop thinking about Helen, the Gill-man soon begins to stalk her and Clete, ultimately abducting her from a seaside restaurant where the two are at a party. Clete tries to give chase, but the Gill-man escapes to the water with his captive. Clete and police arrive just in time and when the creature surfaces, police shoot him as Clete saves Helen.

Cast

Production

Using the working titles of Return of the Creature and Return of the Creature from the Black Lagoon, filming took place at Marineland of Florida which played the part of the film's Ocean Harbor Oceanarium. The St. Johns River stood in for the Amazon in the film.

The Lobster House restaurant where the Creature kidnaps Helen was located in Jacksonville, Florida. It was destroyed by fire in 1962. The Diamondhead Restaurant (now the River City Brewing Co.) was built adjacent to the site where the old Lobster House once stood. Friendship Park was built on the vacant land near where the Lobster House stood.

Revenge of the Creature marks the screen debut of Clint Eastwood, who appears uncredited as a lab technician named Jennings early in the story. He is shown having a discussion with Professor Ferguson, accusing a test subject cat of eating a lab rat, only to find the rat in his lab coat pocket.

Reception
Critically reviewed in The New York Times, Revenge of the Creature was dismissed as a fourth-rate sequel with the comment, "... away we go, as before". Other than some interesting sequences involving the setting, "what is probably the most unusual aquarium in the world makes a nice, picturesque background indeed ..." the review was dismissive of the production. Writing for AllMovie, author Hal Erickson reported that although the film is "[n]ot nearly as good as the first Creature [from the Black Lagoon], this followup is saved by the underwater photography". Although describing the film as a "minor effort" with "not much that's original or engaging", Craig Butler wrote that "audiences may feel more sympathy for the Creature in this [film], as they see him chained up, starved and otherwise mistreated", and that the film contains "a rare (for the period) attempt to humanize the female lead".

Although Revenge of the Creature has been broadcast on television in red-and-blue-glasses anaglyph form (e.g., in 1982 in the San Francisco Bay area), it was originally shown in theaters by the polarized light method and viewed through glasses with gray polarizing filters. A "flat" version without 3D was also released.

In 1997, Revenge of the Creature was mocked on the comedy television series Mystery Science Theater 3000, marking its first episode on the Sci-Fi Channel.

Home media
Universal Studios released Revenge of the Creature on VHS in Universal Monsters Classic Collection and DVD in a boxed set, along with Creature from the Black Lagoon and The Creature Walks Among Us. A bonus behind-the-scenes documentary was added for the set. The film was re-released on Blu-ray, along with both other films in the "Creature" trilogy. Revenge of the Creature was also released on LaserDisc as a double feature with The Creature Walks Among Us.

See also
 List of American films of 1955

References
Notes

Bibliography

 Schickel, Richard. Clint: A Retrospective. New York: Sterling, 2012. .
 Warren, Bill. Keep Watching the Skies, American Science Fiction Movies of the 50s, Vol. I: 1950 - 1957. Jefferson, North Carolina: McFarland & Company, 1982. .
 Weaver, Tom, David Schecter and Steve Kronenberg. The Creature Chronicles: Exploring the Black Lagoon Trilogy. Jefferson, North Carolina: McFarland & Company Inc., 2014. .

External links

 
 
 

1955 horror films
1955 films
1950s science fiction horror films
American science fiction horror films
Films shot in Jacksonville, Florida
Films set in Florida
American black-and-white films
Films directed by Jack Arnold
1950s English-language films
1950s science fiction films
Universal Pictures films
1950s 3D films
American 3D films
American sequel films
Films scored by Herman Stein
Films set in amusement parks
1950s monster movies
1950s American films